Seo District (Seo-gu) is a district of Gwangju, South Korea. Its hanja transcription means "west district", but it is in the center of the city. Its city hall and a convention center are famous landmarks in the district.

External links
Seogu homepage